The FIS Nordic World Ski Championships 2013 took place between 20 February and 3 March 2013 in Val di Fiemme, Italy, for the third time, the event having been hosted there previously in 1991 and 2003.

Host selection
The 2013 championships had a submission deadline of 1 May 2007 to the International Ski Federation (FIS). The facility was chosen at the International Ski Congress in Cape Town, South Africa, on 29 May 2008. Five cities submitted bids for this event. This bid questionnaire used for the upcoming Nordic skiing championships was also used for the FIS Alpine World Ski Championships 2013.

The finalist cities' deadline for the application was 15 August 2007. From 20 August to 19 September 2007, the FIS Inspection group, led by Secretary-General Sarah Lewis, visited each candidate city for the FIS Nordic World Ski Championships 2013. The FIS Alpine World Ski Championships 2013 (Cortina d'Ampezzo (Italy), Schladming (Austria), St. Moritz (Switzerland), and Vail/Beaver Creek, Colorado (United States)) (The deadline for the alpine skiing championships was 31 August 2007) were visited in late 2007. This task force consisted of FIS officials and representatives of the European Broadcasting Union to review the proposed event and act as an advisory body on the feasibility of the implementation. A final report was presented to the FIS Council, FIS Technical Committee, and National Ski Associations in April 2008.

On 12–13 October 2007, delegates for the FIS Nordic World Ski Championships (five total), FIS Alpine World Ski Championships (four total), FIS Ski-Flying World Championships (two total), and FIS Freestyle World Championships (two total) met in Cape Town to review the rules regarding the promotional activities during the Congress. The decision took place in Cape Town with the 17-member FIS Council in May 2008.

The finalist candidates were posted in the 14 May 2008 FIS Newsflash in an effort to show their candidacy prior to the 29 May 2008 selection.

The winner was announced to be Val di Fiemme on the third ballot of exhaustive voting, who will host their third championships.

Voting results

The four cities that lost the bid for the 2013 championships submitted their bids for the 2015 championships on 1 May 2009.

Coordination group

2008
The coordination group for the event first took place on 24 September 2008. Local organization has already taken place given the area has hosted numerous World Cup events in cross-country skiing, Nordic combined, and ski jumping, along with the Tour de Ski competitions. The focus in 2008 was to develop activities for festivals leading up to and at the championships. A young team called "Vision 2013" will work with the tourism association in the Trentino to develop destination packages with the championships.

2009
The organizing committee for the 2009 championships in Liberec met in Oslo with the organizing committee of the 2011 championships on 20 April 2009 to discuss lessons learned. In the presentation was a comprehensive and frank analysis of the critical areas of Liberec's organization. Key success factors were detailed and lessons learned were elaborated, including several recommendations to both the 2011 championships and the organizing committee for the 2013 championships. Besides the 2009, 2011, and 2013 organizing committees in attendance, other attendees included the Norwegian Ski Federation, the European Broadcasting Union television, FIS, and the APF marketing partners. A second organizing committee meeting took place in Val di Fiemme on 3 June 2009 headed by Piero De Godenz and Angelo Corradini. In discussion was great strides in facility upgrades in time for the 2012 test events, along with legacy usage after the championships. Also included were marketing campaigns with EBU and with support from the local area. At a meeting in Cavalese on 26 October 2009, the organizing committee presented a detailed chart where each person listed had specific responsibilities. Most of coordinating group members also participated in the 1991 and 2003 championships. In January 2010, the city hosted the last two stages in the 2009–10 Tour de Ski, the 100th FIS World Cup staged by the Coordinating Group. Marketing and communications presented the event's mission and vision while the technical side involved sport structure, roads, and media broadcasting.

2010
At a 12 May 2010 meeting held in Cavalese, main issues dealt with were event marketing and communications. Venue construction, most notably the Predazzo ski jump renovation, was also discussed. Host broadcaster RAI presented its proposed infrastructure for broadcasting the event, including the addition fibre-optic cable for coverage. FIS Secretary-General Sarah Lewis stated that 700 people, including many youth, had volunteered for the championships as of May 2010.

Schedule
All times are local.

Cross-country

Nordic combined

Ski jumping

Events

Cross-country skiing

Men's

Women's

Nordic combined

Ski jumping

Men's

Women's

Mixed

Medal table

Participating nations
700 athletes 56 countries are scheduled to compete, an increase of 6 from 2011. Togo is scheduled to make its debut appearance.

References

External links
Official website 
Record number of applicants for FIS World Championships 2012–2013. – Retrieved 3 May 2007.

 
FIS Nordic World Ski Championships
FIS Nordic World Ski Championships
FIS Nordic World Ski Championships
Qualification events for the 2014 Winter Olympics
2013 in cross-country skiing
2013 in Italian sport
International sports competitions hosted by Italy
Cross-country skiing competitions in Italy
Nordic skiing competitions in Italy
Sport in Trentino
February 2013 sports events in Europe
March 2013 sports events in Europe